Five ships of the French Navy have borne the name Saône, after the river Saône :
 , was a dahabeah used on the Nile during the French campaign in Egypt and Syria.
  was a corvette launched in 1826 and was renamed Agathe one year later.
 , was a steam warship launched in 1855
  was an aviso launched in 1880
 , is a fleet tanker launched in 1963

French Navy ship names